The Mariachis de Guadalajara (English: Guadalajara Mariachis) are a professional baseball team in the Mexican League based in Zapopan, Jalisco. Their home ballpark is Estadio Panamericano, and has a capacity of 16,500 people. The Mariachis were established in December 2020 and started playing in the 2021 season.

History
The team was established on 8 December 2020, when Mexican president Andrés Manuel López Obrador announced that two new teams would join the Mexican League for the 2021 season: a revival of El Águila de Veracruz (the original franchise was sold in 2017 and moved to Nuevo Laredo) and the Mariachis de Guadalajara. The creation of the Mariachis was a joint effort between Mexican government, the State of Jalisco and private investment.

With the establishment of the Mariachis, Guadalajara joined Monterrey as the only two cities in Mexico that have teams in both the summer league and the winter league.

In March 2021, former Texas Rangers and Anaheim Angels shortstop Benji Gil was announced as the Mariachis' manager for the 2021 season.

Roster

References

Baseball teams in Mexico
Sports teams in Jalisco
Baseball teams established in 2020
Mexican League teams
2020 establishments in Mexico